The Sm2 is a class of electric multiple units in use by VR in commuter traffic in the Helsinki area. Fifty Sm2 units were built between 1975 and 1981 by Valmet in Tampere. 

All Sm2 units were completely renovated between 2002 and 2011. Only the bodywork and the technics remained mostly untouched. Many of the changes are visible to the passengers, including a different type of seat, modern toilets and a new livery consisting of a white bodyside with a green lower band.

Technical information 
Like the Sm1, each Sm2 unit consists of two cars: the Sm2 is the motored car of the multiple unit, while the other car, the driving trailer, is a part of the Eioc class.

The units are numbered from 6051 to 6100 for the Sm2 motored car and 6251 to 6300 for the Eioc driving trailer.

The train can be driven from both ends, which is a major advantage compared to locomotive-pulled trains in commuter traffic. Sm2s can be coupled together with Sm1s forming trains of at most six units (12 cars), but the length of the commuter train platforms limits the maximum length to five in commercial traffic. The full length trains can be seen in depot traffic in the morning and evening. The units use Scharfenberg couplers.

The Sm2 is technically very similar to the older Sm1 EMU, although there are also some differences, such as the Sm1 having steel spring suspension and strengthening creases on the sides. The bodywork is also made of aluminium, as opposed to steel in the Sm1.

The electric systems were developed and built by Strömberg at their plant in Pitäjänmäki, Helsinki.

References 

Literature

External links 
 
 Pictures of the train at Vaunut.org 

Sm2
Sm2